Divorced (Spanish title: Divorciadas) is a 1943 Mexican drama film directed by Alejandro Galindo and starring Blanca de Castejón, René Cardona and Milisa Sierra. The film's sets were designed by the art director Jesús Bracho.

Cast
 Blanca de Castejón as Cristina  
 René Cardona as Luis Reiner  
 Milisa Sierra as Carmen  
 Delia Magaña as Juanita  
 Juan José Martínez Casado as Dr. Rafael Gálvez  
 Virginia Zurí as Elena  
 Ramiro Gómez Kemp as Rolando  
 Eugenia Galindo as Amparo  
 Víctor Velázquez as Robles  
 José Ortiz de Zárate 
 Alfonso Jiménez
 Manuel Dondé as Abogado  
 Lolo Trillo 
 Sofía Haller 
 Joaquín Roche 
 Alfredo Varela as Doctor  
 Alicia Reyna  
 Chiquita Escobar
 Camilo Farjat 
 Ignacio Peón

References

Bibliography 
 Mora, Carl J. Mexican Cinema: Reflections of a Society, 1896-2004. McFarland, 2005.

External links 
 

1943 films
1943 drama films
Mexican drama films
1940s Spanish-language films
Films directed by Alejandro Galindo

Mexican black-and-white films
1940s Mexican films